The 1939 Wake Forest Demon Deacons football team was an American football team that represented Wake Forest University during the 1939 college football season. In its third season under head coach Peahead Walker, the team compiled a 7–3 record and finished in a tie for sixth place in the Southern Conference.

Wake Forest tackle Ruppert Pate was selected by the Associated Press as a first-team player on the 1939 All-Southern Conference football team.

Schedule

References

Wake Forest Demon Deacons football seasons
Wake Forest Demon Deacons
Wake Forest Demon Deacons